Terry Wilson (born 20 December 1959) is a Scottish footballer, who played as a winger for Cowdenbeath, Arbroath, Hibernian, Dunfermline Athletic and Hamilton Academical. He was born in Dunfermline.

External links

1959 births
Living people
Footballers from Dunfermline
Association football wingers
Scottish footballers
Aston Villa F.C. players
Cowdenbeath F.C. players
Arbroath F.C. players
Hibernian F.C. players
Dunfermline Athletic F.C. players
Hamilton Academical F.C. players
Bromsgrove Rovers F.C. players
Scottish Football League players